RCI Hospitality Holdings, Inc. (previously Rick's Cabaret International, Inc.), through its subsidiaries, operates strip clubs, nightclubs, sports bars/restaurants, and a media and convention company that serves the adult club industry. RCI went public with an IPO in 1995 is listed on The NASDAQ Global Market under the symbol RICK.

History 
The company was founded in 1983 by Robert Watters and is based in Houston, Texas. Langan acquired his first gentlemen's club in Texas at age 21 with $40,000 from the sale of his baseball card collection. Subsequently, RCI expanded inside and outside of Texas to states such as New York, Illinois, Florida, Arizona, Minnesota and others, and entered related businesses, such as sports bars/restaurants and nightclubs.

Expansion and development 
RCI owns more than 40 strip clubs under the names Rick's Cabaret, Jaguars Club, Club Onyx, Tootsie's Cabaret, Scarlett's Cabaret, Temptations Cabaret, Downtown Cabaret, Foxy's Cabaret, Kappa Men's Club, Cabaret East, Silver City, The Seville Club, Vivid Cabaret, Hoops Cabaret and XTC Cabaret. Brands have different formats. Rick's Cabaret is an elegant experience with fine dining. Tootsie's Cabaret, Scarlett's Cabaret, and Vivid are "high energy" nightclub/gentlemen's club hybrids with a party atmosphere. XTC Cabaret and Jaguars Clubs are BYOB 18 plus concepts for blue collar and college patrons. Club Onyx's caters to African American professionals. Tootsie's is also known as the largest strip club in the United States with 74,000 square feet.

The nightclub & restaurant brands include Studio 80, an 80s dance music concept, and Bombshells Restaurant and Bar, a military themed sports bar/restaurant chain with 11 locations in Texas. RCI also operates ED Publications, Inc., a media company serving the adult club business with industry-related websites, magazines and trade shows.

RCI has been named to Forbes magazine list of the 200 best companies.  It has been profiled in The Wall Street Journal, Fortune, MarketWatch, Corporate Board Member, SmartMoney, The New York Daily News, USA Today as well as other publications.

Rick's Cabaret in New York City Steakhouse was listed in Zagat's New York Nightlife and included in the TONY 100 list of fine Manhattan dining establishments by Time Out New York.

Entertainment sites Gothamist, Thrillist, Complex, Miami New Times, Broward New Times, Southflorida.com, and Timeout.com have named clubs operating under RCI to their "Best Strip Club" lists. RCI has also won multiple Awards from Ed Publications including 2019 Club Chain of the Year.

Restaurant Business magazine named Bombshells Restaurant & Bar to its "The Future 50" list of fastest-growing concepts.

On July 26, 2021, RCI announced definitive agreements to acquire for $88.0 million 11 adult nightclubs and six related real estate properties. The clubs generated approximately $40 million in revenue and $14 million in adjusted EBITDA in their fiscal year ended December 31, 2019. Five of the clubs are in Denver, Colorado; two near St. Louis, Missouri; and one each in Indianapolis, Indiana; Louisville, Kentucky; Raleigh, North Carolina; and Portland, Maine.

On March 1, 2022, RCI announced Tootsie's Cabaret and Scarlett's Cabaret, both in the Greater Miami are, were the first of RCI's subsidiaries to accept Bitcoin as payment.

See also
 List of strip clubs

References

External links
 

Companies based in Houston
Adult entertainment companies
Companies listed on the Nasdaq
Restaurant chains in the United States
Strip clubs
American companies established in 1983
1983 establishments in Texas
Strip club owners